A Chorus of Storytellers is the fifth studio album by The Album Leaf, released in 2010 by Sub Pop.

The album was recorded by Ryan Hadlock in the frosty month of February 2009 at Bear Creek Studio just outside Seattle. It was mixed in the decidedly warmer month of June in Reykjavík, Iceland by Birgir Jon Birgisson.

Track list
 Perro
 Blank Pages
 There Is A Wind
 Within Dreams
 Falling From The Sun
 Stand Still
 Summer Fog
 Until The Last
 We Are
 Almost There
 Tied Knots

References

2010 albums
The Album Leaf albums
Sub Pop albums
Albums recorded at Bear Creek Studio